John "Jack" Broome (30 June 193028 November 2013) is an English former professional rugby league footballer who played in the 1940s and 1950s.

Playing career

International honours
Broome won caps for England while at Wigan in 1950 against Wales, and France, and won a cap for British Empire XIII while at Wigan in 1952 against New Zealand.

County honours
Broome won caps for Lancashire on six occasions.

Championship final appearances
Broome played right-, i.e. number 3, and scored a try in Wigan's 20-2 victory over Huddersfield in the Championship Final during the 1949–50 season at Maine Road, Manchester on Saturday 13 May 1950, and in Wigan's 13-6 victory over Dewsbury in the Championship Final during the 1951–52 season at Leeds Road, Huddersfield on Saturday 10 May 1952.

County League appearances
Broome played in Wigan's victories in the Lancashire County League during the 1949–50 season and 1951–52 season.

Challenge Cup Final appearances
Broome played right-, i.e. number 3, in Wigan's 10-0 victory over Barrow in the 1950–51 Challenge Cup Final during the 1950–51 season at Wembley Stadium, London on Saturday 5 May 1951.

County Cup Final appearances
Broome played right-, i.e. number 3, in Wigan's 28-5 victory over Warrington in the 1950–51 Lancashire County Cup Final during the 1950–51 season at Station Road, Swinton, on Saturday 4 November 1950, played  and scored a try in Wigan's 14-6 victory over Leigh in the 1951–52 Lancashire County Cup Final during the 1951–52 season at Station Road, Swinton, on Saturday 27 October 1951, and played right-, i.e. number 3, in the 8-16 defeat by St. Helens in the 1953–54 Lancashire County Cup Final during the 1953–54 season at Station Road, Swinton on Saturday 24 October 1953.

References

External links
Statistics at wigan.rlfans.com
Statistics at rugby.widnes.tv

1930 births
2013 deaths
British Empire rugby league team players
England national rugby league team players
English rugby league players
Lancashire rugby league team players
Place of birth missing
Rugby league centres
Rugby league five-eighths
Rugby league fullbacks
Rugby league wingers
Widnes Vikings players
Wigan Warriors players